Moussa Doumbia may refer to:

Moussa Doumbia (footballer, born 1989), Burkinabé football defender
Moussa Doumbia (footballer, born 1994), Malian football midfielder